Stator limbatus is a species of leaf beetle in the family Chrysomelidae. It is native to the southwestern United States, Mexico, and northern South America, where it lives in xeric, semi-arid, and dry tropical environments. It has since spread far beyond its range, including Hawaii, South Africa, the Middle East, and as of 2021, Sardinia and Corsica. S. limbatus feeds on a wide variety of legumes.

References

Further reading

External links

 

Bruchinae
Beetles of South America
Beetles of Central America
Beetles of North America
Beetles of Oceania
Taxa named by George Henry Horn
Beetles described in 1873
Articles created by Qbugbot